1900 Canterbury colonial by-election may refer to 

 1900 Canterbury colonial by-election 1 held on 9 June 1900
 1900 Canterbury colonial by-election 2 held on 28 July 1900

See also
 List of New South Wales state by-elections